The Merle Travis Guitar is the second album by Merle Travis and his first instrumental album. It was recorded in 1955  and released on January 1, 1956 by Capitol Records. Together with another Capitol release of the previous year, Back Home, it introduced the style of guitar playing that came to be known as Travis picking to a wide public of finger-style guitarists and folk music enthusiasts.  The album contains a selection of traditional guitar pickers' tunes from Travis' native Muhlenberg County, Kentucky, and includes old standards, blues and rags.

Track listing

Personnel
Merle Travis - electric guitar

References

1956 albums
Merle Travis albums
Capitol Records albums